Sverre Hansen (24 August 1919 – 21 October 1995) was a Norwegian actor. He was born in Bergen. He made his stage debut at Studioteatret in 1945, and was later assigned at Det Nye Teater, Folketeatret, Nationaltheatret and Fjernsynsteatret. Among his films are minor roles in Ni liv from 1957 and Ugler i mosen from 1959, and his leading role in the film Eggs from 1995 earned him the Amanda Award.

Filmography

References

1919 births
1995 deaths
Actors from Bergen
Norwegian male stage actors
Norwegian male film actors
20th-century Norwegian male actors